Terry Brown may refer to:

Sports
Terry Brown (football chairman), former chairman of West Ham United football club
Terry Brown (football manager) (born 1952), former manager of AFC Wimbledon
Terry Brown (American football) (born 1947), former NFL player for the Minnesota Vikings
Terence Brown (American football) (born 1986), NFL player for the Miami Dolphins
Terry Brown (soccer) (born 1964), retired American soccer player

Others
Terry Brown (bishop), former Anglican Bishop of Malaita
Terry Brown (record producer), English-Canadian record producer
Terry Brown (museum conservator) (born 1953), American museum conservator-restorer
Terry Brown (Michigan politician) (born 1959), member of the Michigan House of Representatives
Terry Brown (Louisiana politician) (born 1946), member of the Louisiana House of Representatives
Terry M. Brown, Jr. (born 1987), member of the North Carolina House of Representatives
Terry W. Brown (1950–2014), member of the Mississippi Senate

See also
Terence Browne, 9th Marquess of Sligo (1873–1952), Irish peer